Tanzeem Nasle Nau Hazara is a welfare organization based in Quetta, Pakistan working for the welfare of Hazara people since 1965.

History 

Tanzeem as a social organization providing education. Tanzeem commits itself to carryout all these activities through its NGO-based struggle without any discrimination of cast, creed, colors and religion.

In 1965, a group of Hazara youth started their efforts to establish a community-based organization, with its office set in a small rented room. With the passage of time

 1965 Beginning of struggle by laying foundation through sports activity, literacy classes for illiterate, adult and children.
 1971 Registration of Tanzeem Nasle Nau Hazara under the societies Act XXI of 1860.
 1985 Establishment of formal school by the name of Tameer Nasle Nau High School.
 1990 English language center for girls and boys.
 1997 Tanzeem Welfare Society registered under voluntary social welfare agencies ordinance 1961(XLVI of 1961).

References

Hazara people
Organisations based in Quetta
1965 establishments in Pakistan